Kenneth Woodrow Reed (November 24, 1941 – September 5, 2014) was a Canadian football player who played as a linebacker for the Edmonton Eskimos and the Saskatchewan Roughriders; he won the Grey Cup in 1966. Born in Poplar Bluff, Missouri, he was an alumnus of the University of Tulsa. Reed, 72 and his wife died in a car accident in 2014 on the Alaska Highway near Fort St. John, British Columbia.

References

1941 births
2014 deaths
American players of Canadian football
Edmonton Elks players
People from Poplar Bluff, Missouri
Players of American football from Missouri
Saskatchewan Roughriders players
Tulsa Golden Hurricane football players
Road incident deaths in Canada
Accidental deaths in British Columbia